In mathematics, an invariant subspace of a linear mapping T : V → V  i.e. from some vector space V to itself, is a subspace W of V that is preserved by T; that is, T(W) ⊆ W.

General description 

Consider a linear mapping 

This can be stated as

Trivial examples of invariant subspaces
 : Since  maps every vector in  into 
 : Since a linear map has to map

1-dimensional invariant subspace U
A basis of a 1-dimensional space is simply a non-zero vector . Consequently, any vector  can be represented as  where  is a scalar.

Therefore, the condition for existence of a 1-dimensional invariant subspace is expressed as:
, where  is a scalar (in the base field of the vector space. 

Formal description 

An invariant subspace of a linear mapping

from some vector space V to itself is a subspace W of V such that T(W) is contained in W. An invariant subspace of T is also said to be  T invariant.

If W is T-invariant, we can restrict T to W to arrive at a new linear mapping

 
This linear mapping  is called the restriction of T on W and is defined by 
 

Next, we give a few immediate examples of invariant subspaces.

Certainly V itself, and the subspace {0}, are trivially invariant subspaces for every linear operator T : V → V. For certain linear operators there is no non-trivial invariant subspace; consider for instance a rotation of a two-dimensional real vector space.

Let v be an eigenvector of T, i.e. T v = λv. Then W = span{v} is T-invariant. As a consequence of the fundamental theorem of algebra, every linear operator on a nonzero finite-dimensional complex vector space has an eigenvector. Therefore, every such linear operator has a non-trivial invariant subspace. The fact that the complex numbers are an algebraically closed field is required here. Comparing with the previous example, one can see that the invariant subspaces of a linear transformation are dependent upon the base field of V.

An invariant vector (i.e. a fixed point of T), other than 0, spans an invariant subspace of dimension 1. An invariant subspace of dimension 1 will be acted on by T by a scalar and consists of invariant vectors if and only if that scalar is 1.

As the above examples indicate, the invariant subspaces of a given linear transformation T shed light on the structure of T. When V is a finite-dimensional vector space over an algebraically closed field, linear transformations acting on V are characterized (up to similarity) by the Jordan canonical form, which decomposes V into invariant subspaces of T. Many fundamental questions regarding T can be translated to questions about invariant subspaces of T.

More generally, invariant subspaces are defined for sets of operators as subspaces invariant for each operator in the set. Let L(V) denote the algebra of linear transformations on V, and Lat(T) be the family of subspaces invariant under T ∈ L(V). (The "Lat" notation refers to the fact that Lat(T) forms a lattice; see discussion below.) Given a nonempty set Σ ⊂ L(V), one considers the invariant subspaces invariant under each T ∈ Σ. In symbols,

For instance, it is clear that if Σ = L(V), then  Lat(Σ) = { {0}, V }.

Given a representation of a group G on a vector space V, we have a linear transformation T(g) : V → V for every element g of G. If a subspace W of V is invariant with respect to all these transformations, then it is a subrepresentation and the group G acts on W in a natural way.

As another example, let T ∈ L(V) and Σ be the algebra generated by {1, T }, where 1 is the identity operator. Then Lat(T) = Lat(Σ). Because T lies in Σ trivially, Lat(Σ) ⊂ Lat(T). On the other hand, Σ consists of polynomials in 1 and T, and therefore the reverse inclusion holds as well.

Matrix representation 

Over a finite-dimensional vector space, every linear transformation T : V → V can be represented by a matrix once a basis of V has been chosen.

Suppose now W is a T-invariant subspace. Pick a basis C = {v1, ..., vk} of W and complete it to a basis B of V. Then, with respect to this basis, the matrix representation of T takes the form:

where the upper-left block T11 is the restriction of T to W.

In other words, given an invariant subspace W of T, V can be decomposed into the direct sum

Viewing T as an operator matrix

it is clear that T21: W → W'  must be zero.

Determining whether a given subspace W is invariant under T is ostensibly a problem of geometric nature. Matrix representation allows one to phrase this problem algebraically. The projection operator P onto W is defined by
P(w + w′) = w, where w ∈ W and w′ ∈ W. The projection P has matrix representation

A straightforward calculation shows that W = ran P, the range of P, is invariant under T if and only if PTP = TP. In other words, a subspace W being an element of Lat(T) is equivalent to the corresponding projection satisfying the relation PTP = TP.

If P is a projection (i.e. P2 = P) then so is 1 − P, where 1 is the identity operator. It follows from the above that TP = PT if and only if both ran P and ran(1 − P) are invariant under T. In that case, T has matrix representation

Colloquially, a projection that commutes with T "diagonalizes" T.

 Invariant subspace problem 

The invariant subspace problem concerns the case where V is a separable Hilbert space over the complex numbers, of dimension > 1, and T is a bounded operator. The problem is to decide whether every such T has a non-trivial, closed, invariant subspace. This problem is unsolved .

In the more general case where V is assumed to be a Banach space, there is an example of an operator without an invariant subspace due to Per Enflo (1976).  A concrete example of an operator without an invariant subspace was produced in 1985 by Charles Read.

 Invariant-subspace lattice 

Given a nonempty set Σ ⊂ L(V), the invariant subspaces invariant under each element of Σ form a lattice, sometimes called the invariant-subspace lattice of Σ and denoted by Lat(Σ).

The lattice operations are defined in a natural way: for Σ′ ⊂ Σ, the meet operation is defined by

while the join operation is defined by

A minimal element in Lat(Σ) in said to be a minimal invariant subspace.

 Fundamental theorem of noncommutative algebra 

Just as the fundamental theorem of algebra ensures that every linear transformation acting on a finite-dimensional complex vector space has a nontrivial invariant subspace, the fundamental theorem of noncommutative algebra asserts that Lat(Σ) contains nontrivial elements for certain Σ.Theorem (Burnside) Assume V is a complex vector space of finite dimension. For every proper subalgebra Σ of L(V), Lat(Σ) contains a nontrivial element.

Burnside's theorem is of fundamental importance in linear algebra. One consequence is that every commuting family in L(V) can be simultaneously upper-triangularized.

A nonempty set Σ ⊂ L(V) is said to be triangularizable if there exists a basis {e1, ..., en} of V such that

In other words, Σ is triangularizable if there exists a basis such that every element of Σ has an upper-triangular matrix representation in that basis. It follows from Burnside's theorem that every commutative algebra Σ in L(V) is triangularizable. Hence every commuting family in L(V) can be simultaneously upper-triangularized.

 Left ideals 

If A is an algebra, one can define a left regular representation Φ on A: Φ(a)b = ab is a homomorphism from A to L(A), the algebra of linear transformations on A

The invariant subspaces of Φ are precisely the left ideals of A. A left ideal M of A gives a subrepresentation of A on M.

If M is a left ideal of A then the left regular representation Φ on M now descends to a representation Φ' on the quotient vector space A/M. If [b] denotes an equivalence class in A/M, Φ'(a)[b] = [ab]. The kernel of the representation Φ' is the set {a ∈ A | ab ∈ M for all b}.

The representation Φ' is irreducible if and only if M is a maximal left ideal, since a subspace V ⊂ A/M is an invariant under {Φ'(a) | a ∈ A} if and only if its preimage under the quotient map, V + M, is a left ideal in A.

Almost-invariant halfspaces

Related to invariant subspaces are so-called almost-invariant-halfspaces (AIHS's). A closed subspace  of a Banach space  is said to be almost-invariant under an operator  if  for some finite-dimensional subspace ; equivalently,  is almost-invariant under  if there is a finite-rank operator  such that , i.e. if  is invariant (in the usual sense) under .

Clearly, every finite-dimensional and finite-codimensional subspace is almost-invariant under every operator.  Thus, to make things nontrivial, we say that  is a halfspace whenever it is a closed subspace with infinite dimension and infinite codimension.

The AIHS problem asks whether every operator admits an AIHS.  In the complex setting it has already been solved; that is, if  is a complex infinite-dimensional Banach space and  then  admits an AIHS of defect at most 1.  It is not currently known whether the same holds if  is a real Banach space.  However, some partial results have been established: for instance, any self-adjoint operator on an infinite-dimensional real Hilbert space admits an AIHS, as does any strictly singular (or compact) operator acting on a real infinite-dimensional reflexive space.

See also
 Invariant manifold
 Lomonosov's invariant subspace theorem

Bibliography
 

 

 

 

Linear algebra
Operator theory
Representation theory